The Province de la Kossi lies in the western part of Burkina Faso and stretches to the border with Mali. It is in the Boucle du Mouhoun Region. The capital of Kossi is the town of Nouna, which has a mayor and high commissioner. The next largest town in Kossi is Djibasso, the last major town on the road from Nouna that heads west into Mali.

In the early 2010s, a major road through the Kossi was paved with support from the Millennium Challenge Corporation. The road links the major towns of Dedougou and Nouna, then continues westward to Djibasso and the border with Mali.

Education
In 2011 the province had 214 primary schools and 20 secondary schools.

Healthcare
In 2011 the province had 22 health and social promotion centers (Centres de santé et de promotion sociale), 5 doctors and 93 nurses.

Demographics
The population of Kossi in 2006 was 272,223. It is a rural province with 253,793 of its residents living in the countryside; only 18,440 live in urban areas. There are 135,342 men living in Kossi Province and 136,891 women.

Departments
Kossi is divided into 10 departments:

See also
 Regions of Burkina Faso
 Provinces of Burkina Faso
Departments of Burkina Faso

References 

 
Provinces of Burkina Faso